SpVgg Bayreuth is a German football club based in Bayreuth, Bavaria. Apart from coming within two games of earning promotion to the Bundesliga in 1979, the club also reached the quarter finals of the DFB-Pokal twice, in 1977 and 1980.

History

1921 to 1945 
Founded in 1921 when the side left gymnastics oriented sport club TuSpo Bayreuth, SpVgg Bayreuth was one of many clubs banned and replaced with a state-sanctioned organization in 1933 during the Nazi campaign against existing sports and other social organizations. A handful of club members reformed a rump side called FSV Bayreuth to carry on the activities of the original association. This team was made up largely of soldiers stationed locally, which resulted in a constantly changing lineup as they were transferred in and out of the area. The old club was quickly resurrected after World War II.

1945 to 1963 
The club initially stood in the shadow of two local rivals, FC Bayreuth and VfB Bayreuth, with the later taking out the Amateurliga Nordbayern (III) title in 1956. SpVgg had earned promotion to this league in 1954, having won the 2. Amateurliga Oberfranken-West title that year and then dominated its promotion round.

The club achieved good results in the Bayernliga and managed to win its division in 1959. The team then went on to beat southern champions Schwaben Augsburg in the finals for the Bavarian title. As the Bavarian champions, the club was entitled to enter the promotion round to the 2. Oberliga Süd, where it had to overcome VfR Pforzheim 2–1 after extra time in a narrow decider for promotion to the second division.

The club spent three seasons in the second tier of Southern German football, achieving a remarkable fifth place in its first year. The second season was a struggle against relegation and, in the third and last one, it was sent down back to the Bayernliga again.

A fourth place in the last season before the league reform in 1963 saw the club qualify for the new single-division Amateurliga Bayern from 1963.

1963 to present 
After the formation of the Bundesliga in 1963, Bayreuth played as a third division team until 1969. Another Amateurliga championship meant promotion to the second tier once more, now the Regionalliga Süd. It proved a short stay and SpVgg was narrowly relegated, losing a decider to ESV Ingolstadt 5–2 after finishing on equal points.

Back in the Bayernliga, the club won an undisputed championship, losing only two out of their 34 games, 15 points clear of the second-placed Wacker München. After another difficult first year in the second division, the club established itself in the league, coming fourth in 1973 and fifth in 1974, results that proved enough to qualify for the new 2. Bundesliga Süd.

The club did quite well in the new league and they came close to moving up to the Bundesliga in 1979 after a second-place finish in 2. Bundesliga Süd (the southern division of 2. Bundesliga), but lost in the promotion round 1–1 and 1–2 to Bayer Uerdingen. It managed to qualify for the new single-division 2. Bundesliga in 1981, too, but the first season in this league was very disappointing and the team was relegated to the Oberliga in 1982, having come last.

The team became a top-side in the Oberliga but took until 1985 to take out the league title again and returned to the second division.

Although relegated to Amateur Oberliga Bayern (III) in 1988 and 1989, the team was spared further demotion when clubs that had finished ahead of them were denied licences due to their financial problems. Bayreuth could not evade relegation after a third consecutive poor finish in 1990, and in 1994 slipped further still to the Bayernliga (IV). A strong campaign returned the side to the Regionalliga Süd (III) for 2005–06. The club was denied a license for the Regionalliga in the 2006/07 season and forcibly relegated to the 4th division Bayernliga. The club won the Bayernliga title for a seventh time, building up a convincing margin to the second placed team, and fulfilling the on-the-field qualification to the Regionalliga. On 11 June 2008, the club was refused a licence for this league and has to remain in the Bayernliga. The club's financial trouble however continued, having to declare insolvency on 22 October 2008, despite sitting second in the league.

In the 2010–11 Bayernliga season, the club unsuccessfully struggled against relegation, dropping down to the Landesliga after a 1–2 extra-time loss to Bayern Hof in a relegation decider.

At the end of the 2011–12 season the club qualified directly for the newly expanded Bayernliga after finishing fourth in the Landesliga. Two seasons later the club won the league and earned promotion to the Regionalliga Bayern. The club, by then had added the title Oberfranken (Upper Franconia) to its name, relocated some of its home games to nearby Weismain and split from the main club with the help of two regional investors.

Stadium 

The club's stadium was originally built in 1967. In 2002 it was renamed the Hans-Walter-Wild-Stadion. Hans Walter Wild is the former mayor of Bayreuth.

Current squad

Honours

League
 2. Bundesliga Süd (II)
 Runners-up: 1979
Regionalliga Bayern (IV)
 Champions: 2022
 Bayernliga (V)
 Champions: (8) 1959 (north), 1969, 1971, 1985, 1987, 2005, 2008, 2014 (north)
 Runners-up: (2) 1958 (north), 1995
 Landesliga Bayern-Nord (VI)
 Champions: (2) 1998, 2001
 Runners-up: 2000
 2. Amateurliga Oberfranken Ost (IV)
 Champions: 1954

Youth 
 Bavarian Under 19 championship
 Runners-up: 1997
 Bavarian Under 15 championship
 Champions: 1977
 Runners-up: 1978

Cup
 DFB-Pokal
 Quarter finals: (2) 1976–77, 1979–80
 Bavarian Cup
 Runners-up: (2) 2006, 2018
 Bavarian League Cup
 Winners: 2019–21
 Oberfranken Cup
 Winners: (2) 2001, 2006

Recent managers 
Recent managers of the club:

Recent seasons 
The recent season-by-season performance of the club:

SpVgg Bayreuth

SpVgg Bayreuth II 

With the introduction of the Bezirksoberligas in 1988 as the new fifth tier, below the Landesligas, all leagues below dropped one tier. With the introduction of the Regionalligas in 1994 and the 3. Liga in 2008 as the new third tier, below the 2. Bundesliga, all leagues below dropped one tier. With the establishment of the Regionalliga Bayern as the new fourth tier in Bavaria in 2012 the Bayernliga was split into a northern and a southern division, the number of Landesligas expanded from three to five and the Bezirksoberligas abolished. All leagues from the Bezirksligas onwards were elevated one tier.
 The 2020–21 Regionalliga Bayern season has been cancelled due to the COVID-19 pandemic in Germany, and the original 2019–20 season was extended until spring 2021. In July 2020, the current league leader Türkgücü München was promoted to the 3. Liga and thus suspended from 2019–21 Regionalliga Bayern, and the club's league results have all been annulled. The 2019–21 Regionalliga Bayern champion and participant in the promotion play-offs against the champions of the 2020–21 Regionalliga Nord was determined end of the discontinued season in a double round-robin play-off series with the top three eligible teams Viktoria Aschaffenburg, SpVgg Bayreuth, and 1. FC Schweinfurt 05.

Key

DFB-Pokal appearances 
The club has qualified for the first round of the DFB-Pokal one quite a number of occasions, reaching the quarter finals in 1979–80 as its best result:

Source:

References

External links 
 
 The Abseits Guide to German Soccer
 SpVgg Bayreuth at Weltfussball.de

SpVgg
Football clubs in Germany
Football clubs in Bavaria
Association football clubs established in 1921
Football in Upper Franconia
1921 establishments in Germany
Sports clubs banned by the Nazis
2. Bundesliga clubs